Zach Calzada (born November 8, 2000) is an American football quarterback who currently plays for the Incarnate Word Cardinals. He played formerly for the Auburn Tigers. Calzada attended and played high school football at Lanier High School in Sugar Hill, Georgia and began his college career at Texas A&M before transferring to Auburn in 2022.

Early life and high school career
Calzada grew up in Sugar Hill, Georgia and attended Lanier High School. He missed a large portion of his senior season after suffering a cracked rib and a punctured lung in the third game of the year. Calzada eventually returned to play and finished the season with 122 completions on 240 pass attempts for 14 touchdowns and was named an Under Armour All-American as Lanier reached the state semifinals. He finished his high school career with 3,429 yards and 29 touchdowns on 238 of 467 passing. Calzada was rated a three-star recruit and committed to play college football at Texas A&M over offers from North Carolina State, North Carolina, and Georgia.

College career

Texas A&M
As a freshman, Calzada completed 12 of 24 pass attempts for 133 yards with two touchdowns and one interception.  Calzada did not see any playing time during the 2020 season.

Calzada competed for the starting quarterback spot going into the 2021 season, but Haynes King was ultimately chosen. Calzada was named the Aggies starter following an injury to King in the second game of the season. He completed 21 of 31 passes for 285 yards with three touchdowns and one interception in a 41-38 upset victory over top-ranked Alabama. Following the game, Calzada was named the Southeastern Conference Offensive Player of the Week, the Davey O'Brien Award Player of the Week, and the Maxwell Award Player of the Week. Calzada finished the season with 2,185 passing yards, 17 touchdowns, and 9 interceptions in ten starts.

On December 13, 2021, Calzada announced he would be transferring from Texas A&M, via social media.

Auburn
On January 6, 2022, Calzada announced he would transfer to Auburn University. On December 5, 2022, Calzada announced he would enter the transfer portal again.

Incarnate Word
On January 11, 2023, Calzada announced he would transfer to The University of the Incarnate Word, an FCS school located in San Antonio, Texas.

Statistics

Personal life
Calzada is a Cuban American.

References

External links
Texas A&M Aggies bio

Living people
People from Gwinnett County, Georgia
American sportspeople of Cuban descent
Sportspeople from the Atlanta metropolitan area
Players of American football from Georgia (U.S. state)
American football quarterbacks
Auburn Tigers football players
Texas A&M Aggies football players
2000 births